Bush Pioneers are people who gathered $100,000 for George W. Bush's 2000 or 2004 presidential campaign. Two new levels, Bush Rangers and Super Rangers, were bestowed upon supporters who gathered $200,000+ or $300,000+, respectively, for the 2004 campaign, after the 2002 McCain–Feingold campaign finance law raised hard money contribution limits. This was done through the practice of "bundling" contributions.  There were 221 Rangers and 327 Pioneers in the 2004 campaign and 241 Pioneers in the 2000 campaign (550 pledged to try). A fourth level, Bush Mavericks, was used to identify fundraisers under 40 years of age who bundled more than $50,000. 

The Pioneer system was devised by Karl Rove. The network has roots in Texan GOP donor lists compiled by Rove, whose political roots are in direct-mail solicitation in the 1980s.

Nineteen of the original Pioneers became ambassadors in 2001. Six Pioneers have been convicted of politics-related crimes.

Pioneers were involved in the 2008 U.S. Presidential election. An analysis in 2006 found that 12 were supporting Rudy Giuliani, 21 supporting John McCain, and 16 supporting Mitt Romney. A July 2008 report found fewer than half of the 2004 Pioneers and Rangers had yet contributed their own money to McCain.

Prominent Pioneers, Rangers and Mavericks 
Roland Arnall, founder of Ameriquest and former Ambassador to the Netherlands
James A. Baker IV, son of James Baker
Haley Barbour, Governor of Mississippi and former Republican National Committee Chairman
Marvin Pierce Bush
William DeWitt, Jr. of Cincinnati, head of an investment firm and co-owner of the St. Louis Cardinals
Richard J. Egan, billionaire from Hopkinton, Massachusetts; founder of EMC Corp. and United States Ambassador to Ireland 2001–2003; his sons, Christopher and Michael, are also Bush Pioneers.
Donald Evans
 Sam Fox, national chairman of the Republican Jewish Coalition
Frank E. Fowler, art dealer from Lookout Mountain, Tennessee who represents the Andrew Wyeth estate
James H. Harless, coal baron.
Dennis Hastert, former Speaker of the House
Ray Lee Hunt
Ken Lay, former Enron CEO
David B. Montgomery, Founder of Montgomery Law Firm (Houston)
Robert Mosbacher, Mosbacher Energy Company
Andrew Bissell
Joe O'Neill, Texas oilman who introduced Mr. Bush to his wife, Laura
David M. Miner, State Representative of North Carolina
George E. Pataki, former Governor of New York State.
Stephen Payne (lobbyist)
Francis Rooney, United States Ambassador to the Holy See
Robert Rowling
Andrew Saul, Chairman of the Federal Retirement Thrift Investment Board
Alex Spanos, Stockton, California real estate developer and owner of the San Diego Chargers.
Nate Morris, CEO of Rubicon
Craig Roberts Stapleton
Jerry Weintraub, film producer, including Nashville and Ocean's Eleven.
Jim Wilkinson
Charles Wyly and Sam Wyly, Texas brothers who collectively represented Bush's 9th greatest career contributor.
Aldona Wos, Physician, later United States Ambassador to Estonia, and wife of future U.S. Postmaster General Louis DeJoy.

References

White House for Sale.org, with interactive name links.
USA Today, October 15, 2003.
Noe indicted: GOP backer is accused of laundering cash Mike Wilkinson and James Drew, Toledo Blade, October 28, 2005

External links
Jim Hightower, $hrub's Pioneer$, BushFiles.com, May 28, 1999.
Charles Laurence, Bush's Rangers on trail to round up record $200m, news.telegraph.co.uk, June 15, 2003.
Steve Kingstone, Bush begins fundraising drive, BBC, June 18, 2003: "If Bill Clinton was the consummate campaigner, George Bush is the final word in campaign fundraising."
Editorial: Bush's Rangers / Money shouldn't make the political world go round, post-gazette, July 21, 2003.
Dave McKenna, Ambassadors of the Game, WashingtonCityPaper, September 13, 2003.
Thomas B. Edsall and Sarah Cohen, Bush Campaign Raises A Record $49.5 Million. For Their Efforts, Fundraisers Also Gain, Washington Post, October 15, 2003: "The record receipts -- more than triple the top Democrat's fundraising for the quarter -- were driven in large part by just 285 men and women, who collected $38.5 million or more, which was at least 45 percent of Bush's total take. This fundraising elite, many of whom were beneficiaries of Bush administration policies, included 100 'Rangers,' who raised at least $200,000 apiece, and 185 'Pioneers,' who collected at least $100,000 each."
Jim Drinkard and Laurence McQuillan, 'Bundling' contributions pays for Bush campaign, USAToday, October 16, 2003.
Glen Justice, Once at Arm's Length, Wall Street Is Bush's Biggest Donor, New York Times, October 23, 2003: "A study to be released today shows that the financial community has surpassed all other groups, including lawyers and lobbyists, as the top industry among Mr. Bush's elite fund-raisers. The list of those generating $100,000 and $200,000 now includes chief executives like Henry M. Paulson of Goldman Sachs, John J. Mack of Credit Suisse First Boston and Stanley O'Neal of Merrill Lynch, whose firm has already raised twice the amount for Mr. Bush's re-election that it did during the entire 2000 campaign cycle. ... 'It's really a question of policy, that's what's driving this,' said Marc Lackritz, president of the Securities Industry Association, which represents more than 650 securities firms. 'It's a pro-investor policy.'"
Glen Justice, Newcomers Provide Fuel for Bush Money Machine, New York Times, March 14, 2004.
Thomas B. Edsall, Sarah Cohen and James V. Grimaldi, "Pioneers Fill War Chest, Then Capitalize," Washington Post, May 16, 2004.
Jonathan E. Kaplan, "RNC offers 'Super Ranger' status," The Hill, May 18, 2004.
Greg Palast, "Give It Back, George. Did Wyly Coyotes' Ill-Gotten Loot Buy White House?," gregpalast.com, April 11, 2005.
John Cheeves, "Kentucky 'Maverick' reels in serious cash for GOP campaign", Lexington Herald-Leader, August 29, 2004.

George W. Bush